Augusto Alexi Quintero Batioja (born 4 May 1990) is an Ecuadorian professional footballer who plays as a forward for Bohemian Football League club Viktoria Žižkov.

Early career
Born in Guayaquil, he played as junior for several Ecuatorian clubs such as Modelo Sport, Manta, LDU Guayaquil and Barcelona SC. Still young, he debuted in the senior teams of both Manta and LDU Guayaquil.

Europe
In 2008, he passed the trials and joined the youth system of Barcelona SC, before moving abroad in summer 2009 and joining Serbian club FK Novi Sad which was playing in the Serbian First League.  In summer 2010 he moved to FK Inđija which had just been promoted to the Serbian SuperLiga. After only six months, he moved to another SuperLiga club, OFK Beograd where he stayed for two and a half seasons.

In summer 2013 he left OFK and joined Montenegrin First League side FK Mladost Podgorica however, as soon as Mladost was eliminated from the European competitions, Batioja was signed by Hungarian side Diósgyőri VTK. He played with Diósgyőr in the Hungarian championship during the 2013–14 season and has won with them the 2014 Hungarian League Cup.  After one year in Hungary, he returned to Serbia and signed with SuperLiga side FK Radnički Niš coached by Dragoslav Stepanović. In winter 2015 he moved to Vysočina Jihlava.

Honours
Diósgyőr
 Hungarian League Cup: 2013–14

References

External links
 Profile at Soccerway
 Batioja's FEF player card 
 Augusto Quintero Batioja Stats at Utakmica.rs

1990 births
Living people
Sportspeople from Guayaquil
Ecuadorian footballers
Association football forwards
Barcelona S.C. footballers
Manta F.C. footballers
RFK Novi Sad 1921 players
FK Inđija players
OFK Beograd players
OFK Titograd players
Diósgyőri VTK players
FK Radnički Niš players
FC Vysočina Jihlava players
FK Viktoria Žižkov players
Serbian SuperLiga players
Nemzeti Bajnokság I players
Czech First League players
Ecuadorian expatriate footballers
Expatriate footballers in Serbia
Expatriate footballers in Montenegro
Expatriate footballers in Hungary
Expatriate footballers in the Czech Republic
Ecuadorian expatriate sportspeople in Serbia
Ecuadorian expatriate sportspeople in Montenegro
Ecuadorian expatriate sportspeople in Hungary
Ecuadorian expatriate sportspeople in the Czech Republic
Czech National Football League players
Bohemian Football League players